Sethurathnam Ravi (S Ravi) is a chartered accountant (CA) based in India, promoter and managing partner of Ravi Rajan & Co. LLP and the former Chairman of Bombay Stock Exchange (BSE). He is also on the Board of Directors of over 45 companies and organisations including IDBI Bank, LIC, ONGC, BHEL, and more. He also serves as an Independent Director of Tourism Finance Corporation of India. In 2003, He was also appointed by Government of India and Reserve Bank of India (RBI) as Chairman of the Technical Experts Committee for Punjab & Sind Bank's strategic turnaround. In 2019, Ravi also joined SBI Payments Services Pvt. Ltd as one of the Board Directors. Before joining BSE, Ravi served on boards of various companies such as, UTI Company Pvt Ltd., SMERA Ratings, SBI-SG Global Securities, STCI Finance, and BOI Merchant Bankers. He also serves as a member of SEBI's takeover panel and Institute of Chartered Accountants of India (ICAI). S Ravi had been appointed as the independent director of the EbixCash Private Limited in June 2021, a subsidiary of Ebix, Inc. a leading international supplier of On-Demand software and E-commerce services to the insurance, financial, healthcare and e-learning industries. He is also a frequent speaker at regulatory bodies, like ICAI, RBI and SEBI, Mr. S Ravi is passionate about sports and issues related to equal rights of women, global climate change and education for all. The Board of PCBL at its meeting held on 31 January 2023 has appointed Dr. Sethurathnam Ravi as a Non-Executive Independent Director of the Company for an initial term of five consecutive years with effect from 15 March 2023.

Education 
 Bachelors and master's degree in commerce from Durgavati University, Madhya Pradesh 
 Fellow member of Institute of chartered accountancy of India 
 Information Systems Auditor (DISA)
 Insolvency Resolution Professional (Insolvency and Bankruptcy Board of India)

References 

Year of birth missing (living people)
Living people